Dnipropetrovsk Academic Opera and Ballet Theatre is an opera house in Dnipro.

The first opera house in Dnipropetrovsk was opened in 1931 as the Dnipropetrovsk Workers' Opera House. In 19341937, Arsenko Arsen Dionysovych performed there. With the beginning of the Second World War, the company was evacuated to Krasnoyarsk, where the Dnieper Opera was merged with the Odessa troupe. The opera house was revived three decades later, on August 31, 1973, when the Council of Ministers of the Ukrainian SSR approved the idea of creating the Dnipropetrovsk Opera and Ballet Theatre.

The modern building was built on the site of a park. The architects based their design on the Zhytomyr Music and Drama Theatre, built in 1966, but both the exterior and interior design has Dnieper Opera has unique features. A feature of the theatre's square, designed by architect Pavel Nirinberg, was the light and music fountain 'Muse' by the sculptor Yuri Pavlov. The opera house was opened on 26 December 1974, with a performance of Tchaikovsky 's ballet Swan Lake.

Petro Varivoda was the conductor at the opera house from 1974 to 1994. Among the outstanding soloists who have performed there are the bass Yuri Sabin-Gus, mezzo-soprano Nonna Surzhina, tenor Alexander Vostryakov, baritone Mykola Poludenny. From 1974 to 1988, most of the choreography was directed by L.V. Voskresenskaya.

Recognition of the troupe of the Dnipropetrovsk Opera and Ballet Theater within the USSR was a tour on the stage of the Bolshoi Theater in 1988. With the beginning of Perestroika, the theater also begins active international touring activities, in particular, Dnipropetrovsk artists perform on the stages of France, Italy, China and the United States.

During the 1990s, the ballet dancers Anna Dorosh and Maxim Chepyk performed at the theatre as well as the opera singers Victor Lutsyuk, Eduard Sribnytsky, and Valentina Kovalenko.

In 2017, ballet dancer and choreographer Dmytro Omelchenko won the AF Shekera Prize for staging the modern ballet Carmen & Jose.

As of the beginning of 2020, the theater's repertoire included 18 operas, 18 ballets, 8 operettas and other musicals.

References

External links 
 Official webpage

Opera houses in Ukraine